John Ritter (1948–2003) was an American actor.

John Ritter may also refer to:
John Ritter (congressman) (1779–1851), American legislator from Pennsylvania
John Ritter (racing driver) (1910–1948), American racing driver
Johann Wilhelm Ritter (1776–1810), German chemist, physicist and philosopher
John D. Ritter, vocalist for American metalcore band Myka Relocate
John H. Ritter (born 1951), American novelist, short story writer, teacher, and lecturer
John Steele Ritter, American classical keyboardist and teacher